The Honda TRX 700XX is an ATV (All Terrain Vehicle) or quad bike. The Honda 700XX is Honda's first generation of the 700XX and is powered by a  single cylinder, 4 valve, electronically injected fuel engine (approximately 53 hp), with electric start and a 5-speed manual transmission with a 1-speed reverse. Top speed approximately 86 MPH. Manufactured from 2008–2009.

References
http://www.atvriders.com/atvmodels/honda2008trx700xxatvsportspecifications.html ATV Riders
http://www.atvriders.com/atvmodels/honda2008trx700xxatvsportspecifications.html

External links 
Honda Powersports
TRX700XX